Tiwa  (Spanish Tigua, also E-nagh-magh) is a group of two, possibly three, related Tanoan languages spoken by the Tiwa Pueblo, and possibly Piro Pueblo, in the U.S. state of New Mexico.

Subfamily members and relations

Southern Tiwa is spoken in by around 1,600 people in Isleta Pueblo, Sandia Pueblo, and Ysleta del Sur Pueblo (Tigua Pueblo).

The remaining two languages form a subgrouping known as Northern Tiwa. Northern Tiwa consists of Taos spoken by 800 people in Taos Pueblo and Picuris spoken by around 220 people in Picuris Pueblo.

The extinct language of Piro Pueblo may also have been a Tiwan language, but this is uncertain (see Piro Pueblo language).

History

After the Pueblo Revolt against the Spanish conquistadors in 1680, some of the Tigua and Piro peoples fled south with the Spanish to El Paso del Norte (present-day Ciudad Juárez, Mexico).  There they founded Ysleta del Sur, Texas; Socorro, Texas; and Senecú del Sur, Mexico. Their descendants continued to live in these communities as late as 1996.

See also
 Jornada del Muerto

Notes

Tanoan languages
Languages of the United States
Indigenous languages of the Southwestern United States
Indigenous languages of the North American Southwest
Tiwa Puebloans
Pueblo culture